Eurostar International Limited (EIL) is the railway company operating the international Eurostar train services between London, Paris, Amsterdam and Brussels via the Channel Tunnel. Eurostar was previously operated by three separate companies in Belgium, France and the United Kingdom, but this structure was replaced by EIL as a new single management company on 1 September 2010. EIL is owned by Eurostar Group.

Eurostar International is the largest customer of Getlink, the owner of the Channel Tunnel.

History

Eurostar International was formed in 1990 as European Passenger Services (EPS), as the division of British Rail responsible for the UK section of the Eurostar operation. Eurostar trains began operating on 14 November 1994, with EPS, NMBS/SNCB and SNCF were each responsible for the running of Eurostar services in their own territory.

On 1 April 1994, EPS signed a fixed-rate track access contract with Railtrack lasting until 29 July 2052 as part of the plans for Regional Eurostar services.

The privatisation of British Rail saw ownership of EPS transferred to London and Continental Railways (LCR) in 1996, which is a property development company owned by the Government of the United Kingdom. This was part of the contract agreed with the British Government for LCR to build and operate High Speed 1 (HS1) between London and the Channel Tunnel. The company was renamed Eurostar (UK) Limited (EUKL) and was to use the income from EUKL to help finance the HS1 project.

Following financial assistance from the government in 1998, LCR was forced to appoint a management contract for EUKL. Bids for the contract were submitted by Virgin Rail Group and Inter-Capital and Regional Rail, a consortium of National Express (40%), SNCF (35%), NMBS/SNCB (15%) and British Airways (10%). The latter was awarded the contract which was to run from 1998 until 2010.

In January 2009, after the completion of HS1, the UK's Department for Transport took control of LCR and announced its intention to put both HS1 and EUKL up for sale. Deutsche Bahn expressed an interest in EUKL but no sale materialised.

On 31 December 2009, EUKL was renamed Eurostar International Limited (EIL). On 1 September 2010, the three national Eurostar operators merged into EIL as a single company with a single management structure. Following this change, the ICRR management contract for the UK business was terminated. Once all Eurostar assets were transferred to EIL, the holdings in the company were amended to LCR (40%), NMBS/SNCB (5%) and SNCF (55%).

LCR sold a 30-year concession to operate HS1 in November 2010 to a Canadian consortium of Borealis Infrastructure and Ontario Teachers' Pension Plan for £2.1bn. EIL then paid access charges to the consortium to operate Eurostar trains on HS1.

On 4 December 2013, the UK Government announced it was looking to sell LCR's 40% stake in EIL.

In January 2014, in a joint venture with Keolis, Eurostar was shortlisted to bid for the InterCity East Coast franchise in the United Kingdom. However the franchise was awarded to Virgin Trains East Coast.

In June 2014, the UK's 40% shareholding in EIL was transferred from LCR to HM Treasury, and a sale process was launched on 13 October 2014. In March 2015, the Treasury announced it had sold the stake to Caisse de dépôt et placement du Québec (CDPQ) (30%) and Hermes Infrastructure (10%) for £585m. It also confirmed agreement to redeem its preference share in EIL for £172m, raising £757m in total.

In 2020, Eurostar shareholders unanimously appointed Jacques Damas as chief executive officer, following news that previous CEO Mike Cooper will join Arriva as Group CEO, and facing the challenges of exiting the COVID-19 crisis and leading it towards future developments.

In April 2022, Eurostar International's ownership was transferred into a new holding company named Eurostar Group, along with THI Factory. The previous shareholders now own a part of the new holding company.

Fleet
EIL is the owner of the Class 373 and British Rail Class 374 sets.

References

External links
Company website

Eurostar
Holding companies of the United Kingdom
Railway companies of the United Kingdom
Railway companies established in 1990
1990 establishments in England